is a Japanese male volleyball player. He is part of the Japan men's national volleyball team. On club level he plays for Suntory Sunbirds. He used to play for Senshu University. He started volleyball at the age of seven under the influence of his parents. He used to attend Ube Commercial High School.

Personal life
Kenya Fujinaka has two younger brothers who are playing volleyball in V.League as well. Younger brother Yuto Fujinaka (藤中 優斗) who plays as outside hitter in JTEKT Stings while the youngest brother Soshi Fujinaka (藤中 颯志) joins VC Nagano Trident as Libero.

He's married and has a son.

References

External links
 profile at FIVB.org

1993 births
Living people
Japanese men's volleyball players
People from Yamaguchi Prefecture
Sportspeople from Yamaguchi Prefecture
Universiade medalists in volleyball
Universiade bronze medalists for Japan
Medalists at the 2017 Summer Universiade